Damm is a village and a former municipality in the district of Rostock, in Mecklenburg-Vorpommern, Germany. Since 7 June 2009, it is part of the municipality Dummerstorf.

Villages in Mecklenburg-Western Pomerania